Noop (like no-op) was a project by Google engineers Alex Eagle and Christian Gruber aiming to develop a new programming language. Noop attempted to blend the best features of "old" and "new" languages, while syntactically encouraging well accepted programming best-practices. Noop was initially targeted to run on the Java Virtual Machine.

Noop progressed past its initial proposals into a limited interpreter, but according to the project owners they no longer intend to pursue the language any further. Among the reasons cited for discontinuing work on the language was the initial release of Kotlin, which achieves many of the language goals of Noop. The Noop language can be executed as an interpreted language, as a compiled language, or as java code.

Creation 
The Noop language was created by Google. It was presented during the 2009 edition of the JVM Language Summit held in Santa Clara, California from September 16 to 18, 2009.

Examples 
Hello world in Noop
import noop.Application;
import noop.Console;

class HelloWorld(Console console) implements Application {

  Int main(List args) {
    String s = "Hello World!";

    console.println(s);
    return 0;
  }
}

References

External links 
 H-Online article about Noop
 Article about Noop by The Register
 Article about Noop by ADT Magazine

Object-oriented programming languages
Discontinued Google software
JVM programming languages